Wagler is a surname. Notable people with the surname include:

Erich Wagler (1884–1951), German ichthyologist and malacologist
Johann Georg Wagler (1800–1832), German herpetologist and ornithologist
Ryan Wagler (born 1990), American singer

English-language surnames